Common duct may  refer to:
 Common hepatic duct
 Common bile duct